Chicago Syndicate is a 1955 American film noir crime film directed by Fred F. Sears and starring Dennis O'Keefe and Abbe Lane.

Plot
Accountant and war hero Barry Amsterdam is asked by Chicago newspaper editor David Healey and civic leaders to go undercover and infiltrate the crime syndicate of Arnold Valent, who runs a corrupt insurance business. Valent is believed responsible for murdering bookkeeper Nelson Kern, who had gone to the newspaper with proof of the criminal activity.

Barry hears how Kern's wife then committed suicide and daughter Joyce was committed to an institution. That and a $60,000 reward convince him to accept the dangerous job. He goes to a nightclub Valent owns, the Maracas, meeting a woman named Sue Morton who helps him gain access. There he meets Valent's girlfriend, singer Connie Peters. He then tells Valent he was a witness to Kern's murder and will go to police unless Valent makes him a better offer.

Valent hires but doesn't trust him, at least until Barry, secretly working with the police, arranges a jewel theft and insurance scam. Turning again to Sue Morton for help, she pulls a gun on Barry and orders him to leave. But she learns from police who he really is, Sue works with Barry, revealing she is actually the murdered man's daughter, Joyce Kern.

Unable to find some incriminating microfilm, Barry runs out of options until he schemes to make Connie jealous by introducing the other woman to Valent, who makes a play for her. Connie threatens to expose Valent, whose thugs give her a brutal beating. She gets the microfilm to Barry, who is shot and wounded before Valent is killed by the police.

Cast
 Dennis O'Keefe as	Barry Amsterdam
 Abbe Lane as Connie Peters
 Paul Stewart as Arnold 'Arnie' Valent
 Xavier Cugat as Benny Chico
 Allison Hayes as Joyce Kern – alias Sue Morton
 Richard H. Cutting as David Healey / Narrator
 Chris Alcaide as Nate
 William Challee as Dolan
 John Zaremba as Det. Lt. Robert Fenton
 George Brand as Jack Roper
 Hugh Sanders as Pat Winters 
 Mark Hanna as Brad Lacey
 Carroll McComas as Mrs. Valent

Production
The King Brothers sued Columbia and Clover Productions for damages of $1 million due to their using the title Chicago Syndicate, claiming they registered the title The Syndicate in 1950.

References

External links
 
 
 

1955 films
1955 crime drama films
American black-and-white films
American crime drama films
Columbia Pictures films
Film noir
Films directed by Fred F. Sears
Films set in Chicago
1950s English-language films
1950s American films